Wonderland is the 38th album release by British composer Michael Nyman and the soundtrack to the 1999 film Wonderland.  It is the first of many collaborations of Nyman with director Michael Winterbottom.  For Winterbottom, Nyman would later perform excerpts of this score in 9 Songs, provide a score  for The Claim, and arrangements and re-used tracks for A Cock and Bull Story.  Nyman's daughter, Molly, has continued the family working relationship with Winterbottom, scoring The Road to Guantanamo with Harry Escott.

Nyman has said that the soundtrack to Wonderland is his favourite film score. The New York Times compared the score to that of Stewart Copeland for Rumble Fish and said that "the rhythms are like a clock ticking" and that it is "alternately plaintive and mournful". The Guardian characterized it as "sumptuous, romantic". Senses of Cinema said the music was "heart-wrenching, full of tragic qualities, yet also extremely light".

Track listing
molly
eddie
nadia
dan
debbie
bill
eileen
jack
darren
unnamed
franklyn

Personnel
Michael Nyman Band
Jackie Shave, Beverley Davison, Jonathan Rees, Katherine Shave, Sophie Landon, Fran Andrade, Miranda Fullylove, Jonathan Evan-Jones, violin
 William Hawkes, Andrew Parker, Kate Musker, viola
Anthony Hinnigan, Sophie Harris, cello
 Paul Morgan, contrabass
David Roach, soprano saxophone
 Simon Haram, soprano & alto saxophone
Andrew Findon, tenor baritone saxophone, flute 
 Martin Elliott, bass guitar
David Lee, French horn
Steve Sidwell, trumpet
Nigel Barr, trombone
Michael Nyman, piano, conducting
produced by Michael Nyman

References

Michael Nyman soundtracks
Drama film soundtracks
1999 soundtrack albums